Roberto Carballés Baena was the defending champion but chose not to defend his title.

Federico Gaio won the title after defeating Paolo Lorenzi 6–3, 6–1 in the final.

Seeds
All seeds receive a bye into the second round.

Draw

Finals

Top half

Section 1

Section 2

Bottom half

Section 3

Section 4

References

External links
Main draw
Qualifying draw

Internazionali di Tennis di Manerbio - Trofeo Dimmidisì - Singles
2019 Singles